Pontianak is a 1957 Malay horror film directed by Indian film director Balakrishna Narayana Rao, popularly known as B.N. Rao, and starring Maria Menado and M. Amin. Based on the Malay folktales of a blood-sucking ghost born from a woman who dies in childbirth, the smash hit premiered on 27 April 1957 and screened for almost three months at the local Cathay cinemas. Its success spawned two other sequels, Dendam Pontianak (Revenge of the Pontianak, 1957) and Sumpah Pontianak (Curse of the Pontianak, 1958). It is also said to have launched the Pontianak genre in Malaysia and Singapore, with rival Shaw producing its own Pontianak trilogy and several movies of the same genre were also made in Malaysia.

This film is believed to be lost along with its sequel. There are different stories of how the films went missing. One is that Ho Ah Loke the film producer was frustrated and decided to throw the film into a mining pool. Second is that the film was disposed as Ho's wife was angry at him for storing films in an air-conditioned room in their house. The last was that Ho was doing some clearing of his house and decided to dispose the films into a mining pool.

Synopsis
An old man (Wak Dollah) had found a little girl in the forest, then took and cared for her as an adopted child and gave her the name Comel. The old man, who also wrote a book on traditional medicine, lived alone in a hut in the woods. As an adult, Comel's condition is not as cute as her name, instead she is an ugly girl, plus her body is crooked and is often cursed and abused by the villagers. Before he passed away, Comel’s adoptive father had instructed him to destroy by burning everything he produced including his book of essays. However, while Comel was carrying out the trust of her adoptive father, she came across a book that gave tips (secrets) on how to be beautiful. Comel didn’t burn the book as entrusted, but used it to make herself beautiful. Comel mix the ingredients, as noted in the book and drink it when the moon floats. After drinking it Comel fell unconscious, and when conscious Comel found herself to be beautiful. The beauty has a condition, that is, Comel cannot taste blood, let alone drink it, which is overlooked by Cute, because she wants too much to be beautiful. After becoming beautiful, Comel left the hut where he had sheltered all this time and went to a nearby village where he became the attraction of the son of Tok Penghulu (Othman), then married her to have a daughter (Maria). One day, while in the garden, Othman was bitten by a snake. Comel tried to seek help but her husband, who was in pain, asked Comel to suck on the snake's bite so that it could be removed. Comel was all wrong but at Othman's insistence she had to do it, which made her husband's blood taste good, and she sucked it as much as she could until Othman die. Comel changed her face worse than her original face, and because of that she even disappeared. Since then, Comel has become a Vampire and often goes out at night. Comel also always came to meet his daughter, Maria, by bringing food in the form of fruits he obtained from the forest. In addition, with her beauty she seduces man after man, and when she turns into a Vampire (Pontianak) she even kills to allow her to suck blood to continue to remain beautiful. The situation in the village is not as peaceful as before, Pontianak has tortured and killed.

Cast
Maria Menado as Chomel
M. Amin as Othman
Mustapha Maarof as Samad
Salmah Ahmad as Maria
M. Kassim as Tabib Razak
Dollah Sarawak as Wak Dollah
Hassan Temberang as Bomoh Karto
Puteh Lawak as Dol
Wahid Satay as Wak Satay
Aman Belon
Aini Jasmin
Radia Sudiro

Box Office Success

In conjunction with Hari Raya Aidilfitri, the film producer (Keris Film Production) has made reservations at the Cathay cinema, Singapore for 2 days in addition to the midnight screening on April 27, 1957. It will then be transferred to the Taj Cinema in Geylang. However, due to the unexpected response, so many people came, the 2 -day booking (1 - 2 May 1957) had to be canceled and extended until 13 May 1957. This meant 13 days of screening and it was a huge success for Keris Film Production and its distributor the Cathay Organization. Malay Film Productions (Shaw Brothers), which has been dominating the response to its films, was also surprised by the overwhelming response to the "Pontianak" film. Prior to this, Cathay cinemas had never screened Malay films. It is only for the screening of Hollywood and European films. Interestingly, the film did not continue to be screened in Singapore after the 'last day' on 13 May 1957. It was revisited by Singaporean audiences from 1 August 1957 to 27 August 1957 at the Taj cinema in Geylang. Screenings there took 27 days, and when mixed with Cathay (including midnight screenings) 14 days, means the entire screening of "Pontianak" (first run) in Singapore alone, 41 days. One of the most successful achievements at that time, and even such great Malay Film Productions (MFP) films were not expected to collect unexpectedly like this film.

Awards

"Pontianak" also participated in the 4th Southeast Asia Film Festival (later known as the Asia-Pacific Film Festival) in Tokyo, Japan in May 1957. In addition to the film is "Mega Mendong" directed by L. Krishnan and "Anak-Ku Sazali" directed by Phani Majumdar. However it failed to win any awards, unlike “Mega Mendong” which brought success to Adek Wan Hussain as the best child actor. "Anak-Ku Sazali" won the main award won by P. Ramlee as the best male actor, while Tony (Tony Castello) was the best child actor.

References

External links
 

1957 films
Singaporean horror films
Malay-language films
1957 horror films
Malaysian horror films